is a tram station operated by Tokyo Metropolitan Bureau of Transportation's  Tokyo Sakura Tram located in Kita, Tokyo, Japan. It is 6.9 kilometres from the terminus of the Tokyo Sakura Tram at Minowabashi Station.

Layout
Takinogawa-itchome Station has two opposed side platforms.

Surrounding area
 National Route 122
 Inner Circular Route

History
 August 20, 1911: Station opened

Railway stations in Tokyo
Railway stations in Japan opened in 1911
Kita, Tokyo